Betta prima is a species of gourami. It is native to Asia, where it occurs in southeastern Thailand, and Laos. It is typically found among plants in marshes and slow-flowing streams. The water that the species occurs in is typically clear, with a pH of 6.6, a conductivity of 180 µS/cm, and a temperature of 25.8 °C (78.4 °F). The species reaches 5 cm (2 inches) in standard length and is known to be a facultative air-breather.

References 

prima
Fish described in 1994
Fish of Thailand